Rakuten Mobile, Inc. (commonly known as Rakuten Mobile) is a Japanese mobile network operator (MNO) headquartered in Setagaya, Tokyo. It is a wholly owned subsidiary of Japanese e-commerce giant Rakuten. Currently, Rakuten Mobile offers 4G and 5G services.

History 
Rakuten Mobile was founded in January 2018 in Tokyo.

Services

LTE (4G) 

Rakuten Mobile launched its cellular service in Japan (which was LTE) in April 2020 and with this, it became the 4th telecom operator in the country.

5G 
Rakuten mobile started rolling out its 5G service in Oct 2020 in selected regions of Japan.

References

External links 

 
 Official Japanese website

Rakuten
Mobile phone companies of Japan
Japanese companies established in 2018
Telecommunications companies based in Tokyo